Capture and release may refer to:

Catch and release, a recreational fishing practice
Capture & Release, a 2005 drone metal album by Khanate
Capture/Release, a 2005 post-punk album by The Rakes
Trap–neuter–return, a strategy for controlling feral animal populations

See also
Catch and release (disambiguation)